Midland Gate Shopping Centre is located in Midland, Western Australia.  It is north of Great Eastern Highway, and east of the earlier Midland Junction shopping area that was focused on the Great Northern Highway.

Midland Gate is one of three shopping centres in Western Australia with all three discount department storesKmart, Target and Big W, with the other two being Mandurah Forum and Lakeside Joondalup. It has over 200 specialty stores, three supermarkets (Coles, Aldi and Woolworths), a fresh food mall, food court and an eight-screen Ace Cinema Complex.

History
Swan City Shopping Centre opened in March 1980, with Midland Gate as a separate centre and Sayer Street dividing them. Sayer Street closed in the early 1990s and a pedestrian mall was created, which unofficially merged the Midland Gate and Swan City shopping centres together. The first expansion of Midland Gate occurred in 1995, with the structure removed and Midland Gate officially absorbing Swan City.

In the early 2000s expansions were delayed, until the mid-2000s when the delays were no longer present.

Midland Gate was handed over to Novion in 2015. Previously, it was owned by Colonial First State. The centre had extensive expansion and rebuilding in 2016–2017.

References

External links

Shopping centres in Perth, Western Australia
Midland, Western Australia
Shopping malls established in 1980